The Mausoleum of Attar of Nishapur is located in Nishapur in northeastern Iran. It's located near the Mausoleum of Omar Khayyám. 
The structure is octagonal in shape with a tile worked onion shaped dome. It has 4 entrances, the northern one is the main entrance. The structure is adorned with colored (green, yellow and blue) tiles and carvings. The interior site is covered by plaster and has four seats. The Mausoleum is located in a garden covering an area of about 119 sq. m. The grave of the well known painter Kamal-ol-molk is also situated in a part of this garden. This mausoleum was initially built by the order of Ali-Shir Nava'i during the reign of the Tmurid dynasty in Persia.

Gallery

References

Sources

External links
 "Iran Tourism & Touring Online"

Attar
Buildings and structures in Nishapur
Attar of Nishapur
Tourist attractions in Razavi Khorasan Province
15th-century architecture